Vizhithelu is a 2023 Indian Tamil-language action thriller film directed by  A. Tamil Selvan. The film stars Ashok Kumar, Gayathiri Rema in the lead roles with Billy Murali, Salem Saravanan, Saravana Sakthi, Paruthiveeran Sujatha and Vinodhini Vaidyanathan portraying supporting roles. The film was released theatrically on 3 March 2023.

Cast

Plot 
The film is based on online gambling and developed around the theme of internet fraud.

Production 
The film's first look was released by Nakkheeran Editor Nakkeeran Gopal and Director S. A. Chandrasekhar. The film's audio launch took place on 12 January 2023.

Reception 
The film was released on 3 March 2023 across Tamil Nadu. A critic from dhinathanthi gave "Director A. Tamil Selvan tells the story with a sense of responsibility and moves the scenes briskly to raise awareness about internet scams.". A critic from Maalai malar gave mixture of reviews

References

External links 
 

Indian action drama films
2020s Tamil-language films